The Highways Act 1980 (1980 c.66) is an Act of the Parliament of the United Kingdom dealing with the management and operation of the road network in England and Wales. It consolidated with amendments several earlier pieces of legislation. Many amendments relate only to changes of highway authority, to include new unitary councils and national parks. By virtue of the Local Government (Wales) Act 1994 and the Environment Act 1995, most references to local authority are taken to also include Welsh councils and national park authorities.

By virtue of the National Assembly for Wales (Transfer of Functions) Order 1999 most references to 'the Minister' are taken to include the Senedd. The Act is split into 14 parts covering 345 sections, it also includes 25 schedules.

Part 1: Highway authorities and agreements between authorities
Part 1 includes sections 1 to 9 of the Act. The legislation contained in these sections covers:
 Highway Authorities
 Agreements between authorities

Part 2: Trunk roads, classified roads, metropolitan roads, special roads

Part 2 includes sections 10 to 23 of the Act. The legislation contained in these sections covers:
 Trunk roads
 Classified roads
 Metropolitan roads
 Special roads (such as motorways)

Part 3: Creation of highways

Part 3 includes sections 24 to 35 of the Act. The legislation contained in these sections covers:
 Creation of new highways
 Creation of new footpaths and bridleways
 Dedication of highways

Private landowners sometimes display a notice quoting Section 31, when there is no dedication of a public right of way.

Part 4: Maintenance of highways
Part 4 includes sections 36 to 61 of the Act. The legislation contained in these sections covers:
 Highways maintainable at public expense, and their maintenance
 Maintenance of privately maintainable highways
 Powers covering enforcement of liabilities and recovery of costs
 Defence in respect of specific matters in legal action against a highway authority for damages for non-repair of highway

Section 38 Agreement

Under Section 38 of the Act, the highway authority may agree to adopt private roads. The authority can agree to adopt the street as a highway maintainable at public expense when all the street works have been carried out to their satisfaction, within a stated time. It is customary for the developer to enter into a bond for their performance with a bank or building society.

Part 5: Improvement of highways
Part 5 includes sections 62 to 105 of the Act. The legislation contained in these sections covers:
 Various powers to improve highways including – but not limited to:
 Widening of highways
 Installation of guardrails
 Construction, reconstruction and improvement of bridges and the like

Part 6: Navigable waters and watercourses

Part 6 includes sections 106 to 111 of the Act. The legislation contained in these sections covers:
 Construction of bridges over and tunnels under navigable waters
 Diversions of watercourses

Part 7: Provision of special facilities

Part 7 includes sections 112 to 115 of the Act. The legislation contained in these sections covers:
 Provision of picnic sites.
 Provision of public conveniences.
 Provision of areas for parking heavy goods vehicles.

Part 8: Stopping up of highways
Part 8 includes sections 116 to 129 of the Act. The legislation contained in these sections covers:
 Stopping up and diversion of highways
 Stopping up means of access to highways

Part 9: Lawful and unlawful interference with highways
Part 9 includes sections 130 to 185 of the Act. The legislation contained in these sections covers:
 Protection of public rights
 Damage to highways
 Obstruction of highways
 Danger or annoyance to highway users
 Precautions to be taken in doing certain works
 Request the highway authority to construct a vehicle crossing over a footway or verge in the highway

Part 10: New streets
Part 10 includes sections 186 to 202 of the Act. The legislation contained in these sections covers:
 New street byelaws
 Requirements and prohibitions as to new streets
 Enforcement of byelaws

Part 11: Making up of private streets
Part 11 includes sections 203 to 237 of the Act. The legislation contained in these sections covers:
 The private street works code
 The advance payments code
 General powers relating to private streets

Part 12: Acquisition, vesting and transfer of land
Part 12 includes sections 238 to 271 of the Act. The legislation contained in these sections covers:
 Acquisition of land for highway works
 Compensation relating to compulsory acquisition of land
 Vesting of land
 Transfer of property and liability when the status of a highway changes

Part 13: Financial provisions
Part 13 includes sections 272 to 281 of the Act. The legislation contained in these sections covers:
 Various rules on financial transactions relating to highways

Section 278 Agreement
A Section 278 Agreement allows private developers to either fund or complete works to public highways outside or beyond the development site itself, such as traffic calming and capacity improvements. The document is signed by the local highway authority and the developer to ensure that works are completed to the highway authority's satisfaction.

Part 14: Miscellaneous and supplementary powers
Part 14 includes sections 282 to 345 of the Act. The legislation contained in these sections covers:
 Various supplementary powers including – but not limited to:
 Inquiries
 Disputes over compensation
 Prosecutions and appeals
 Regulations, schemes and orders

Schedules
The Act contains 25 schedules.

See also
Highway Act
Highways in the United Kingdom

References

External links
 

United Kingdom Acts of Parliament 1980
United Kingdom planning law
Roads in the United Kingdom
1980 in transport
Transport policy in the United Kingdom
Transport legislation
History of transport in the United Kingdom